Bearwin Meily (born April 4, 1976) is a Filipino comedian actor, TV host and a recent vlogger.

Early career
He started his career as an extra Palibhasa Lalake in ABS-CBN and eventually became regular.

Current career
But later on he moved to ABS-CBN's rival network GMA 7. When his showbiz career eventually slowed down, Bearwin turned his attention to magic and is now a professional magician.

In 2011, Bearwin moved to TV5.

In 2014, Bearwin returned to ABS-CBN 2 for his current sitcom, Home Sweetie Home.

On March 23, 2015, Bearwin was part of the "Lucky Stars" of Kapamilya, Deal or No Deal and won P1,000,000, making Bearwin as first millionaire of the season five.

In 2019, Bearwin returned to GMA 7 with his two programs, a drama anthology, "Tadhana", and a comedy anthology, "Dear Uge".

In 2020, Bearwin also guested "Mars Pa More" as a cooking guy on the set and aired also on Kapuso Network GMA 7.

Politics
He ran for councilor of Taytay, Rizal in 2019, but lost, landing on the 9th place.

Personal life
Bearwin is the younger brother of movie director Mark Meily.

Filmography

Television

Film

References

1976 births
Living people
ABS-CBN personalities
Filipino male television actors
Filipino male comedians
GMA Network personalities
Star Magic
TV5 (Philippine TV network) personalities